Lev Gennadiyevich Voronin (born 8 June 1971) is a Russian team handball player and Olympic champion from 2000 in Sydney.

He competed for Russia at the 1996 Summer Olympics, where the Russian team placed fifth. He was part of the Russian team that won gold medals at the 2000 Summer Olympics.

References

External links

1971 births
Living people
Russian male handball players
Olympic handball players of Russia
Handball players at the 1996 Summer Olympics
Handball players at the 2000 Summer Olympics
Olympic gold medalists for Russia
Sportspeople from Astrakhan
Olympic medalists in handball
Medalists at the 2000 Summer Olympics